Count Gedeon Ráday de Ráda (18 October 1872, in Budapest – 22 September 1937) was a Hungarian politician, who served as interior minister in 1921. His parents were Gedeon Ráday, a former Minister of Defence of Hungary, and Philippine von Pergen.

References
 Magyar Életrajzi Lexikon

1872 births
1937 deaths
Politicians from Budapest
Hungarian Interior Ministers
Gedeon
Lord-lieutenants of a county in Hungarian Kingdom